This is a list of schools in Buckinghamshire, England, in that part of the county under the authority of Buckinghamshire Council.

State-funded schools

Primary schools

Abbey View Primary Academy, High Wycombe
Ash Hill Primary School, High Wycombe
Ashmead Combined School, Aylesbury
Aston Clinton School, Aston Clinton
The Aylesbury Vale Academy, Aylesbury
Bearbrook Combined School, Aylesbury
Bedgrove Infant School, Aylesbury
Bedgrove Junior School, Aylesbury
Beechview Academy, High Wycombe
Bierton CE Combined School, Bierton
Bledlow Ridge School, Bledlow Ridge
Booker Hill School, High Wycombe
Bourton Meadow Academy, Buckingham
Brill CE School, Brill
Brookmead School, Ivinghoe
Broughton Infant School, Broughton
Broughton Junior School, Broughton
Brushwood Junior School, Chesham
Buckingham Park CE Primary School, Buckingham Park
Buckingham Primary School, Buckingham
Burford School, Marlow Bottom
Butlers Court School, Beaconsfield
Cadmore End CE School, Cadmore End
Carrington Infant School, Flackwell Heath
Carrington Junior School, Flackwell Heath
Castlefield School, High Wycombe
Cedar Park School, Hazlemere
Chalfont St Giles Infant School and Nursery, Chalfont St Giles
Chalfont St Giles Junior School, Chalfont St Giles
Chalfont St Peter CE Academy, Chalfont St Peter
Chalfont St Peter Infant School, Chalfont St Peter
Chalfont Valley E-ACT Primary Academy, Little Chalfont
Chartridge Combined School, Chartridge
Cheddington Combined School, Cheddington
Chenies School, Chenies
Chepping View Primary Academy, High Wycombe
Chesham Bois CE School, Chesham Bois
Chestnut Lane School, Amersham
Claytons Primary School, Bourne End
Coleshill CE Infant School, Coleshill
Cuddington and Dinton CE School, Cuddington
Curzon CE Combined School, Penn
Dagnall CE School, Dagnall
Danesfield School, Medmenham
Denham Green E-Act Primary Academy, Denham
Denham Village School, Denham
The Disraeli School, High Wycombe
Dorney School, Dorney Reach
The Downley School, Downley
Drayton Parslow Village School, Drayton Parslow
Dropmore Infant School, Dropmore
East Claydon CE School, East Claydon
Edlesborough Primary Academy, Edlesborough
Elangeni School, Amersham
Elmhurst School, Aylesbury
Elmtree Infant and Nursery School, Chesham
Farnham Common Infant School, Farnham Common
Farnham Common Junior School, Farnham Common
Foxes Piece School, Marlow
Frieth CE Combined School, Frieth
Fulmer Infant School, Fulmer
George Grenville Academy, Buckingham
The Gerrards Cross CE School, Gerrards Cross
Great Horwood CE School, Great Horwood
Great Kimble CE School, Great Kimble
Great Kingshill CE Combined School, Cryers Hill
Great Missenden CE Combined School, Great Missenden
Green Ridge Primary Academy, Berryfields
Grendon Underwood Combined School, Grendon Underwood
Haddenham Community Infant School, Haddenham
Haddenham Community Junior School, Haddenham
Haddenham St Mary's CE School, Haddenham
Halton Community Combined School, Halton
Hamilton Academy, High Wycombe
Hannah Ball School, High Wycombe
Hawridge and Cholesbury CE School, Hawridge
Haydon Abbey School, Aylesbury
Hazlemere CE Combined School, Hazlemere
High Ash CE Combined School, Great Brickhill
High Wycombe CE Combined School, High Wycombe
Highworth Combined School and Nursery, High Wycombe
Holmer Green Infant School, Holmer Green
Holmer Green Junior School, Holmer Green
Holtspur School, Holtspur
Holy Trinity CE School, Marlow
Hughenden Primary School, Hughenden Valley
Hyde Heath Infant School, Hyde Heath
Ibstone CE Primary School, Ibstone
Ickford School, Ickford
Iver Heath Infant School and Nursery, Iver Heath
Iver Heath Junior School, Iver Heath
Iver Village Infant School, Iver
The Iver Village Junior School, Iver
Ivingswood Academy, Chesham
The John Hampden School, Wendover
Jordans School, Jordans
Juniper Hill School, Flackwell Heath
King's Wood School, High Wycombe
Kingsbrook View Primary Academy, Broughton
Lace Hill Academy, Buckingham
Lane End Primary School, Lane End
Lee Common CE School, Lee Common
Lent Rise School, Burnham
Ley Hill School, Ley Hill
Little Chalfont Primary School, Little Chalfont
Little Kingshill Combined School, Little Kingshill
Little Marlow CE School, Little Marlow
Little Missenden CE School, Little Missenden
Long Crendon School, Long Crendon
Longwick CE Combined School, Longwick
Loudwater Combined School, Loudwater
Maids Moreton CE School, Maids Moreton
Manor Farm Community Infant School, Hazlemere
Manor Farm Junior School, Hazlemere
Marlow CE Infant School, Marlow
Marsh Gibbon CE Primary School, Marsh Gibbon
Marsh School, High Wycombe
Marsworth CE Infant School, Marsworth
The Mary Towerton School, Studley Green
Millbrook Combined School, High Wycombe
Monks Risborough CE Primary School, Monks Risborough
Mursley CE School, Mursley
Naphill and Walters Ash School, Walters Ash
Newton Longville CE Combined School, Newton Longville
Newtown School, Chesham
North Marston CE School, North Marston
Oak Green School, Aylesbury
Oakley CE Combined School, Oakley
Oakridge School, High Wycombe
Our Lady's RC Primary School, Chesham Bois
Overstone Combined School, Wing
Padbury CE School, Padbury
Prestwood Infant School, Prestwood
Prestwood Junior School, Prestwood
Princes Risborough Primary School, Princes Risborough
Quainton CE Combined School, Quainton
Radnage CE Primary School, Radnage
Robertswood School, Chalfont St Peter
St Edwards RC Junior School, Aylesbury
St George's CE Infant School, Amersham
St James and St John CE Primary School, Chackmore
St John's CE Primary School, Lacey Green
St Joseph's RC Infant School, Aylesbury
St Joseph's RC Primary School, Chalfont St Peter
St Louis RC Primary School, Aylesbury
St Mary & All Saints CE Primary School, Beaconsfield
St Mary's CE Primary School, Amersham
St Mary's CE School, Aylesbury
St Mary's Farnham Royal CE Primary School, Farnham Royal
St Michael's RC School, High Wycombe
St Michael's CE Combined School, Stewkley
St Nicolas' CE Combined School, Taplow
St Paul's CE Combined School, Wooburn
St Peter's CE Combined School, Burnham
St Peter's RC Primary School, Marlow
Seer Green CE School, Seer Green
Speen CE School, Speen
Spinfield School, Marlow
Steeple Claydon School, Steeple Claydon
Stoke Mandeville Combined School, Stoke Mandeville
The Stoke Poges School, Stoke Poges
Stokenchurch Primary School, Stokenchurch
Stone CE Combined School, Stone
Swanbourne CE School, Swanbourne
Thomas Harding Junior School, Chesham
Thomas Hickman School, Aylesbury
Thornborough Infant School, Thornborough
Turnfurlong Infant School, Aylesbury
Turnfurlong Junior School, Aylesbury
Twyford CE School, Twyford
Tylers Green First School, Tylers Green
Tylers Green Middle School, Tylers Green
Waddesdon Village Primary School, Waddesdon
Waterside Primary Academy, Chesham
Wendover CE Junior School, Wendover
West Wycombe School, West Wycombe
Westcott CE School, Westcott
Weston Turville CE School, Weston Turville
Whaddon CE School, Whaddon
Whitchurch Combined School, Whitchurch
Widmer End Community Combined School, Widmer End
William Harding School, Aylesbury
Wingrave CE Combined School, Wingrave
Winslow CE School, Winslow
Wooburn Green Primary School, Wooburn Green
Woodside Junior School, Amersham

Non-selective secondary schools

Amersham School, Amersham
The Aylesbury Vale Academy, Aylesbury
The Beaconsfield School, Beaconsfield
Bourne End Academy, Bourne End
Buckingham School, Buckingham
Buckinghamshire University Technical College, Aylesbury
Chalfonts Community College, Chalfont St Peter
Chiltern Hills Academy, Chesham
The Cottesloe School, Wing
Cressex Community School, High Wycombe
The Grange School, Aylesbury
Great Marlow School, Marlow
Highcrest Academy, High Wycombe
Holmer Green Senior School, Holmer Green
John Colet School, Wendover
The Kingsbrook School, Broughton
Mandeville School, Aylesbury
The Misbourne School, Great Missenden
Pioneer Secondary Academy, Stoke Poges
Princes Risborough School, Princes Risborough
St Michael's RC School, High Wycombe
Sir Thomas Fremantle School, Winslow
Sir William Ramsay School, Hazlemere
Waddesdon Church of England School, Waddesdon

Grammar schools

Aylesbury Grammar School, Aylesbury
Aylesbury High School, Aylesbury
Beaconsfield High School, Beaconsfield
Burnham Grammar School, Burnham
Chesham Grammar School, Chesham
Dr Challoner's Grammar School, Amersham
Dr Challoner's High School, Little Chalfont
John Hampden Grammar School, High Wycombe
Royal Grammar School, High Wycombe
Royal Latin School, Buckingham
Sir Henry Floyd Grammar School, Aylesbury
Sir William Borlase's Grammar School, Marlow
Wycombe High School, High Wycombe

Special and alternative schools

Alfriston School, Knotty Green
Aspire, High Wycombe
Booker Park School, Aylesbury
The Buckinghamshire Primary Pupil Referral Unit, Aylesbury
Chiltern Way Academy, Prestwood/Wendover
Chiltern Wood School, High Wycombe
Furze Down School, Winslow
Heritage House School, Chesham
Kite Ridge School, High Wycombe
Pebble Brook School, Aylesbury
Stocklake Park Community School, Aylesbury
Stony Dean School, Amersham
Westfield School, Bourne End

Further education
Amersham and Wycombe College, Amersham & High Wycombe
Aylesbury College, Aylesbury

Independent schools

Primary and preparatory schools

Ashfold School, Dorton
Beachborough School, Westbury
The Beacon School, Chesham Bois
Caldicott School, Farnham Royal
Chesham Preparatory School, Orchard Leigh
Crown House School, High Wycombe
Dair House School, Farnham Royal
Davenies School, Beaconsfield
Gateway School, Great Missenden
Gayhurst School, Chalfont St Peter
Godstowe Preparatory School, High Wycombe
Griffin House School, Little Kimble
Heatherton School, Amersham
High March School, Beaconsfield
Maltman's Green School, Chalfont St Peter
Swanbourne House School, Swanbourne

Senior and all-through schools

Akeley Wood School, Lillingstone Dayrell
The Chalfonts Independent Grammar School, Chalfont St Giles
International School of Creative Arts, Wexham
Pipers Corner School, Great Kingshill
St Mary's School, Gerrards Cross
Stowe School, Stowe
Teikyo School United Kingdom, Wexham
Thornton College, Thornton
Thorpe House School, Chalfont St Peter
Wycombe Abbey, High Wycombe

Special and alternative schools
Benjamin College, Fairford Leys
Eton Dorney Independent Therapeutic School, Dorney
MacIntyre School, Wingrave
The PACE Centre, Aylesbury
Progress Schools - Buckinghamshire, High Wycombe
Unity College, High Wycombe

Buckinghamshire